Plastic Eye Miracle is the first studio album by the rock band God Bullies. It was released in 1989 through Mad Queen Records. The album was reissued in 1990 on Amphetamine Reptile Records.

Track listing

Personnel 
God Bullies
Adam Berg – drums
Mike Corso – bass guitar
Mike Hard – vocals
David B. Livingstone – guitar, keyboards, production, engineering
Production and additional personnel
Tom Hazelmyer – cover art
Peter Houpt – guitar on "Live Sex (Mamma)"
Aadam Jacobs – recording

References

External links 
 

1988 debut albums
Amphetamine Reptile Records albums
God Bullies albums